The Robertson B1-RD is an American ultralight aircraft that was designed by Glen Bashforth and Bruce Bashforth and produced by the Robertson Aircraft Corporation. The aircraft was supplied as a kit for amateur construction with production starting in June 1982.

Design and development
It has a cable-braced high-wing, single-seat, open cockpit, single engine in tractor engine configuration, and is equipped with conventional landing gear.

The aircraft is made from bolted together aluminum tubing with the wings and tail surfaces covered in Dacron sailcloth. Its  span wing is cable-braced to a top surface inverted "V" kingpost. The wing is a single-surface airfoil with a double-surface wing covering optional. The controls are conventional three-axis, including Junkers-style flaperons. The main fuselage structure is an aluminum keel tube that runs from the tail, mounts the wings and then the engine at the front. The original standard engines were the  Cuyuna 430R and the  Cuyuna 215. The landing gear has bungee-suspension on all three wheels and the tailwheel is steerable.

Production of the B1-RD was curtailed circa 1984 due to liability concerns.

Variants
In addition to the standard single-seat model, a two-seat version of the B1-RD was also marketed.

Specifications (B1-RD)

References

External links
Photo of B1-RD
Photo of B1-RD 
Photo of B1-RD

1980s United States ultralight aircraft
Homebuilt aircraft
B1-RD
Single-engined tractor aircraft
High-wing aircraft